The 2016 season was Molde's ninth consecutive year in Tippeligaen, and their 40th season in the top flight of Norwegian football. Along with the Tippeligaen, the club also competed in the Norwegian Cup and 2015–16 UEFA Europa League.

The 2016 Eliteserien season is the first season since 2004 without former club captain Daniel Berg Hestad, who retired after the Europa League round of 32 defeat against Sevilla on 25 February 2016. He played 666 games for the club and won 7 trophies, more than any other Molde player.

Season events
Club legend Daniel Berg Hestad had earlier announced that he was going to retire after the 2015 season, but changed his mind because of the ongoing successes of the club in UEFA Europa League. Initially, his contract expired on 31 December 2015, but he was given a special deal from the club allowing him to play for the club until they were knocked out from the Europa League. On 25 February 2016, Molde were defeated 1–3 on aggregate by Sevilla in the round of 32 and Berg Hestad retired with the 1–0 win at home against Sevilla as his last game.

After the season was finished, Ruben Gabrielsen was named Molde FK Player of the season through a vote on the club's website. Best player in the under-23 category was Petter Strand.

Squad

Reserve squad

Transfers

In

Out

Loans out

Released

Trial

Friendlies

Competitions

Tippeligaen

Results summary

Results by round

Results

Table

Norwegian Cup

UEFA Europa League

Knockout phase

As winners of group A in the group stage, Molde were seeded for the Europa League round of 32 draw, along with the other group stage winners and the best four third-placed finishers in the Champions League group stage. The draw took place on 14 December 2015 and saw Molde drawn against two-time defending Europa League champions Sevilla, with the away tie taking place on 18 February and the home tie on 25 February 2016. Molde lost 0–3 away in Seville. In the second leg, Molde won 1–0 through a goal scored by Eirik Hestad in what became club legend Daniel Berg Hestad's 666th and final appearance for Molde. Molde exited the tournament, losing 1–3 on aggregate. Sevilla went on to win their third consecutive title in the competition.

Squad statistics

Appearances and goals

|-
|colspan="14"|Players away from Molde on loan:

|-
|colspan="14"|Players who appeared for Molde no longer at the club:

|}

Goal scorers

Disciplinary record

See also
Molde FK seasons

References

2016
Molde
Molde